"Tell Her" is a song written by Craig Wiseman and Kwesi B, and recorded by American country music group Lonestar. It was released in September 2000 as the fifth and final single from their third studio album Lonely Grill (1999). The song reached number one on the Billboard country charts, becoming their sixth number one hit.

Content
"Tell Her" is a country pop ballad. In it, the male narrator addresses a male friend of his who is "lookin' for a friend" to help him. In the first verse, the narrator discovers that his friend is having difficulty in his relationship ("So you say your love's about to end / You say you can't take no more, she's out the door"). The narrator then asks whether the friend was "furious" or if he told his loved one that he loves her.

Co-writer Kwesi B. told The Tennessean that the idea came from a songwriting session with Craig Wiseman. At the time, Kwesi had just had an argument with his wife but reconciled with her the next day. He presented his feelings to Wiseman during the session. The two recorded a demo which was sent to producer Dann Huff, who then gave the song to Lonestar, for whom he was producing at the time. The song is in G major with a main chord pattern of Em-Am-C-G.

Chart performance
"Tell Her" reached its peak of number one on the Billboard country charts for the week of February 3, 2001. It held the position for two weeks. Like "What About Now" before it, the song also reached the top 40 on the Billboard Hot 100, peaking at number 39. It was the fourth consecutive number one song from the album.

Year-end charts

Notes

References

2000 singles
1999 songs
Lonestar songs
Songs written by Craig Wiseman
Song recordings produced by Dann Huff
BNA Records singles